The Ganja-Gazakh Economic Region was one of the 10 economic regions of Azerbaijan. It consisted of Aghstafa, Dashkasan, Gadabay, Goranboy, Goygol, Gazakh, Samukh, Shamkir, Tovuz administrative districts, as well as the cities of Ganja and Naftalan. The most developed and important city of Ganja-Gazakh economic region was Ganja city. The total population was 1,265,200 as of January 1, 2017, representing about 13.6% of the country's population. In the economic region, 47 percent of the population lived in urban areas, and 53 percent lived in rural areas. Population density 103 people per km2 of land area.

The region was abolished on 7 July 2021 and its territory was split among the newly created Ganja-Dashkasan and Gazakh-Tovuz economic regions.

Agriculture

Demographics 
The demographics of the economic region includes the demographic features of the population of the region including population growth, population density, economic status and other aspects. According to the population census data in 2017, urban population accounted for 47% and rural was 53%.

State programs 
The State Program on socio-economic development of regions of Azerbaijan Republic (was approved by the Decree of the President of the Republic of Azerbaijan dated February 11, 2004) covered also the Ganja-Gazakh region and was aimed to ensure efficient use of internal resources, development of sectors that bearing particular importance for the economic region, further expansion of production activity of enterprises, stimulation of export-oriented production of goods, increase of employment levels through the development of local entrepreneurship, expand reforms in the agrarian sector and further improvements in the living standards of the population of the economic region. The program covered Aghstafa, Dashkesen, Gedebey, Goranboy, Goygol, Gazakh, Samukh, Shamkir, Tovuz districts and the cities of Ganja and Naftalan. “The state program for the development of tourism in the Republic of Azerbaijan between 2010 and 2014” tended to prepare recreational plans for recreational tourism resorts and sanatoriums (recreation-placement objects) in the economic region. In addition, the third state program on regional development (2014-2018) contributed to the improvement of the agriculture, tourism, housing and public utilities, transport and other sectors.

See also 
 Ganja, Azerbaijan
 Economy of Ganja

References

Economic regions of Azerbaijan